Dover High School is a high school located in Dover, Delaware. It is a part of the Capital School District.

Communities served include the majority of Dover, as well as Cheswold, Hartly, Little Creek, and about half of Leipsic.

 Dover High School's principal is Courtney Voshell.

Special programs

Dover High School offers a program for students to become certified nursing assistantss.

Since 2006, members of Dover High's Japanese Club have participated in a cultural exchange program with its sister school located in Kakuda, Japan.

Referendum

A 2010 Capital School District referendum on funding for a new Dover High School and renovation of other district schools passed on March 31. Construction of the new school began in the spring of 2011, and was completed in the fall of 2014.

Awards and achievements

In 2009 a record-breaking number of AP Scholars were recognized at the school. A total of 49 students were named for 2010, with two of them also being named as National AP Scholars.

Dover High School was recognized as a National Blue Ribbon School of Excellence in 1986.

The school made Newsweeks list of America's Best High Schools for five straight years, beginning in 2006. Below is a table of Newsweeks ratings of Dover High School.

Dover High School's BPA team performed well at the 2010 National Leadership Conference, placing 6th in Fundamentals of Web Design, 1st in PC Servicing and Troubleshooting, 3rd in Network Design, and 9th in Small Business Management.

The school entered the Odyssey of the Mind, and placed 7th in the World Finals in 2009.

Notable alumni

Arts and entertainment
Robert Crumb, cartoonist, graduated in 1961
Ukee Washington, newscaster
Kayla Martell, Miss Delaware 2010
Teri Polo, actress, model
Diana Son, playwright and TV producer
Rob Tornoe, nationally-syndicated cartoonist

Politics
Robin Christiansen (1968), mayor of Dover since 2014, city councilman from 1983 to 2001, and council president and vice mayor from 1990 to 2001.
James Hutchison (1961), first full-time mayor of Dover and current city councilman
Gary Traynor, associate justice of the Delaware Supreme Court

Space
Andrew R. Morgan (1994), Astronaut class of 2013

Sports
Hameen Ali, college football player honored for persevering through difficult life circumstances
Renie Martin, pitcher for the Kansas City Royals and San Francisco Giants from 1979 to 1984

See also
 List of high schools in Delaware

References

External links
 

Dover, Delaware
High schools in Kent County, Delaware
Public high schools in Delaware
Buildings and structures in Dover, Delaware
1965 establishments in Delaware
Educational institutions established in 1965